Heikki Aaltoila, (11 December 1905, Hausjärvi – 11 January 1992, Helsinki) was a Finnish film composer who served 40 years as the conductor of Finnish National Theatre's orchestra. Aaltoila's best known composition is a romantic waltz called Akselin ja Elinan häävalssi (Akseli's and Elina's wedding waltz) which originally belonged to the score of the film Here, Beneath the North Star (1968). He won the Jussi Award for best film score twice.

His other film compositions included music for Veteraanin voitto, Kvinnan bakom allt, and Prinsessa Ruusunen.

External links 
 

1905 births
1992 deaths
Finnish film score composers
Male film score composers
20th-century Finnish composers
20th-century Finnish male musicians